Juan Carreño de Miranda (25 March 1614 — 3 October 1685) was a Spanish painter of the Baroque period.

Biography

Born in Avilés in Asturias, son of a painter with the same name, Juan Carreño de Miranda. His family moved to Madrid in 1623, and he trained in Madrid during the late 1620s as an apprentice to Pedro de las Cuevas and Bartolomé Román. He came to the notice of Velázquez for his work in the cloister of Doña María de Aragón and in the Church of Our Lady of the Rosary (Iglesia de la Virgen del Rosario), La Joyosa.

In 1658, Carreño was hired as an assistant on a royal commission to paint frescoes in the Alcázar of Madrid; later destroyed in the fire of 1734. In 1671, upon the death of Sebastián de Herrera, he was appointed court painter to the queen (pintor de cámara) and began to paint primarily portraits. He refused to be knighted in the Order of Santiago, saying "Painting needs no honors, it can give them to the whole world". He is mainly recalled as a painter of portraits. His main pupils were Mateo Cerezo, Juan Martín Cabezalero, José Jiménez Donoso, and José de Ledesma. He died in Madrid.

Noble by descent, he had an understanding of the workings and psychology of the royal court as no painter before him, making his portraits of the Spanish royal family in an unprecedented documentary fashion. Most of his work are portraits of the royal family and court, though there are some altarpieces, early works commissioned mainly by the church.

Selected works

References

External links

 Scholarly articles about Juan Carreño de Miranda both in web and PDF @ the Spanish Old Masters Gallery
 Catholic Encyclopedia article
 ARTEHISTORIA
Juan Carreño de Miranda on artcyclopedia
Jusepe de Ribera, 1591-1652, an exhibition catalog from The Metropolitan Museum of Art (fully available online as PDF), which contains material on de Miranda (see index)
Velázquez , an exhibition catalog from The Metropolitan Museum of Art (fully available online as PDF), which contains material on de Miranda (see index)

1614 births
1685 deaths
17th-century Spanish painters
Spanish male painters
Painters from Asturias
Spanish Baroque painters
People from Avilés
Court painters
Catholic painters
Baroque painters